Donde los Ponys Pastan (Where Ponies Graze) is the debut EP of the Mexican indie band Porter. Their first single, "Espiral", received extensive airplay on Mexican radio stations and on Mexican music television.

The album was re-released in late 2007 with a bonus live version of "Espiral" as track 8.

Track listing

Personnel
Juan Son – vocals
Fernando de la Huerta – guitar
Victor Valverde – guitar, synthesizer
Diego Rangel – bass, synthesizer
Juan Pablo "Chata" Vázquez – drums

References 

2005 debut EPs
Porter (band) albums